The 2012 UNAF U-20 Tournament was the 6th edition of the UNAF U-20 Tournament. The tournament took place in Dar El Beïda, Algiers, from March 27 to March 30, 2012. Tunisia won the competition after topping the group stage.

Participants

 (invited)

Tournament

Matches

Champions

Scorers
2 goals
  Youssef Essaidi

1 goal
  Zinedine Ferhat
  Niaff Abdulaye
  Omar Atiallah
  Idriss Mhirsi
  Bounouas
  Seif Jaziri

Own goal
  Lounis Hamar

References

2012 in African football
U20
UNAF U-20 Tournament
UNAF U-20 Tournament